Tangeni Iiyambo is a Namibian politician. He is the president of the South West Africa National Union (SWANU) since 2017. Tangeni Iiyambo has served in the National Assembly of Namibia since 2018. In the 2019 Namibian general election Iiyambo ran as presidential candidate. He only gathered 0.7% of the popular vote but will continue to occupy the sole seat in Parliament that SWANU won.

References

External links
 Swanu Appeal For Socialism. Usutuaije Maamberua. The Namibian, 12 December 2008

Living people
Members of the National Assembly (Namibia)
SWANU politicians
Candidates for President of Namibia
Year of birth missing (living people)